Uruguay competed at the 2000 Summer Olympics in Sydney, Australia.

Medalists

Athletics

Men
Track and road events

Women
Field events

Cycling

Road
Men

Track

Equestrian

Eventing

Judo

Men

Sailing

Men

Shooting

Men

Swimming

Men

Women

See also
Uruguay at the 1999 Pan American Games

References

Montevideo.com
Wallechinsky, David (2004). The Complete Book of the Summer Olympics (Athens 2004 Edition). Toronto, Canada. . 
International Olympic Committee (2001). The Results. Retrieved 12 November 2005.
Sydney Organising Committee for the Olympic Games (2001). Official Report of the XXVII Olympiad Volume 1: Preparing for the Games. Retrieved 20 November 2005.
Sydney Organising Committee for the Olympic Games (2001). Official Report of the XXVII Olympiad Volume 2: Celebrating the Games. Retrieved 20 November 2005.
Sydney Organising Committee for the Olympic Games (2001). The Results. Retrieved 20 November 2005.
International Olympic Committee Web Site
 sports-reference

Nations at the 2000 Summer Olympics
2000 Summer Olympics
Olympics